Fengyun 2-05, also known as Fengyun 2D is a Chinese weather satellite which was launched in 2006. It was the fourth satellite to be launched of the Fengyun 2 series, and the second operational spacecraft. It is part of the Fengyun programme.

A Long March 3A carrier rocket was used to launch Fengyun 2-05, flying from Launch Area 2 at the Xichang Satellite Launch Centre. The launch took place at 00:53 UTC (08:53 CST) on 8 December 2006, with the carrier rocket placing the satellite into a geosynchronous transfer orbit. An FG-36 apogee motor was then used to raise the satellite into geosynchronous orbit. It is positioned at a longitude of 86.5 degrees east.

References

Satellites orbiting Earth
Satellites of China
Spacecraft launched in 2006
Spacecraft launched by Long March rockets